Cold Springs is a neighborhood in Buffalo, New York.

Geography 
Cold Springs is a smaller neighborhood within the larger East Side of Buffalo. Its western boundary is Main Street, northern is East Delavan Avenue, East is Jefferson Avenue, and the Southern is East Utica Street.

Notable places 
 Buffalo Academy for Visual and Performing Arts

See also
Neighborhoods of Buffalo, New York

References

Neighborhoods in Buffalo, New York